Dancesport at the 2007 Asian Indoor Games was held in Macao Forum, Macau, China from 27 October to 28 October 2007.

Medalists

Standard

Latin

Medal table

Results

Standard

Five dances
28 October

Quickstep
27 October

Preliminaries

Final

Slow foxtrot
27 October

Preliminaries

Final

Tango
27 October

Preliminaries

Final

Viennese waltz
27 October

Preliminaries

Final

Waltz
27 October

Preliminaries

Final

Latin

Five dances
27 October

Cha-cha-cha
28 October

Preliminaries

Final

Jive
28 October

Preliminaries

Final

Paso doble
28 October

Preliminaries

Final

Rumba
28 October

Preliminaries

Final

Samba
28 October

Preliminaries

Final

References
 2007 Asian Indoor Games official website
 The Asian DanceSport Federation

2007 Asian Indoor Games events
2007
Asian